Carlos Lucas Manríquez (4 June 1930 – 19 April 2022) was a Chilean boxer. He won the bronze medal in the light heavyweight division at the 1956 Summer Olympics in Melbourne, Australia. He also claimed the bronze at the 1959 Pan American Games in Chicago, United States.

References

External links
 

1930 births
2022 deaths
Olympic boxers of Chile
Boxers at the 1956 Summer Olympics
Boxers at the 1960 Summer Olympics
Olympic bronze medalists for Chile
People from Villarrica
Olympic medalists in boxing
Chilean male boxers
Medalists at the 1956 Summer Olympics
Pan American Games bronze medalists for Chile
Pan American Games medalists in boxing
Boxers at the 1959 Pan American Games
Light-heavyweight boxers
Medalists at the 1959 Pan American Games
20th-century Chilean people
21st-century Chilean people